Duncan Menzies may refer to:

 Duncan Menzies, Lord Menzies (born 1953), judge of the Supreme Courts of Scotland.
 Duncan Menzies (architect) (1837–1910), Scottish architect and civil engineer
 Duncan Menzies (curler) (born 1994), Scottish curler